Grant County is a county located in the U.S. state of New Mexico. At the 2020 census, the population was 28,185. Its county seat is Silver City. The county was founded in 1868 and named for Ulysses S. Grant, the 18th President of the United States.

Grant County comprises the Silver City, NM, Micropolitan Statistical Area. It is part of the Southwest New Mexico Council of Governments.

Geography

Adjacent counties
 Catron County - north
 Sierra County - east
 Luna County - southeast
 Hidalgo County - south
 Greenlee County, Arizona - west

National protected area
 Gila National Forest (part)

Demographics

2000 census
At the 2000 census, there were 31,002 people, 12,146 households and 8,514 families living in the county. The racial make-up was 75.67% White, 0.52% Black or African American, 1.35% Native American, 0.29% Asian, 0.03% Pacific Islander, 19.02% from other races, and 3.11% from two or more races. 48.79% of the population were Hispanic or Latino of any race.

There were 12,146 households, of which 31.30% had children under the age of 18 living with them, 52.70% were married couples living together, 12.90% had a female householder with no husband present, and 29.90% were non-families. 25.70% of all households were made up of individuals, and 10.70% had someone living alone who was 65 years of age or older. The average household size was 2.50 and the average family size was 3.01.

26.20% of the population were under the age of 18, 8.50% from 18 to 24, 23.70% from 25 to 44, 25.10% from 45 to 64 and 16.50% were 65 years of age or older. The median age was 39 years. For every 100 females there were 95.10 males. For every 100 females age 18 and over, there were 91.30 males.

The median household income was $29,134 and the median family income was $34,231. Males had a median income of $31,126 and females $19,627. The per capita income was $14,597. About 15.10% of families and 18.70% of the population were below the poverty line, including 25.90% of those under age 18 and 9.50% of those age 65 or over.

2010 census
At the 2010 census, there were 29,514 people, 12,586 households and 7,941 families living in the county. The racial make-up was 84.9% white, 1.4% American Indian, 0.9% black or African American, 0.4% Asian, 0.1% Pacific islander, 9.6% from other races and 2.8% from two or more races. Those of Hispanic or Latino origin made up 48.3% of the population. In terms of ancestry, 11.9% were English, 11.8% were German, 10.4% were Irish, and 2.9% were American.

Of the 12,586 households, 26.9% had children under the age of 18 living with them, 45.3% were married couples living together, 12.6% had a female householder with no husband present, 36.9% were non-families, and 30.9% of all households were made up of individuals. The average household size was 2.30 and the average family size was 2.86. The median age was 45.9 years.

The median Household income was $36,591 and the median family income  was $44,360. Males had a median income of $38,731 and females $27,161. The per capita income was $21,164. About 11.7% of families and 14.8% of the population were below the poverty line, including 23.8% of those under age 18 and 5.2% of those age 65 or over.

2020 census
At the 2020 census, there were 28,185 people and 11,496 households in the county. The racial make-up was 64.8% white, 2.1% American Indian, 1.1% Black or African American, 0.7% Asian, 0.1% Native Hawaiian or Pacific Islander, 11.7% from other races, and 19.5% of two or more races. 47.8% of the population are of Hispanic origin.

Communities

City
 Bayard

Towns
 Hurley
 Silver City (county seat)

Village
 Santa Clara

Census-designated places

 Arenas Valley
 Buckhorn
 Casas Adobes
 Cliff
 Cobre
 Faywood
 Gila
 Gila Hot Springs
 Hachita
 Hanover
 Lake Roberts
 Lake Roberts Heights
 Little Walnut Village
 Mimbres
 North Hurley
 Pinos Altos
 Redrock
 Rosedale
 San Lorenzo
 Trout Valley
 Tyrone
 White Signal

Unincorporated communities
 Carpenter
 Dwyer
 Fort Bayard
 Mangas Springs
 Mimbres Valley
 Mule Creek
 Riverside
 Separ
 Sherman

Politics
Grant County is heavily Democratic. Since 1932, it has only voted for the Republican presidential nominee twice, both times by narrow margins.

See also
 National Register of Historic Places listings in Grant County, New Mexico

References

Further reading

 Caballero, Raymond, McCarthyism vs. Clinton Jencks. Norman: University of Oklahoma Press, 2019.

 
1868 establishments in New Mexico Territory
Populated places established in 1868